Cameraria gaultheriella is a moth of the family Gracillariidae. It is known from British Columbia, Canada, and California, Oregon and Maine in the United States. It is an adventive species in the Netherlands and the United Kingdom, but is not established.

The wingspan is 10–11 mm.

The larvae feed on Gaultheria species, including Gaultheria shallon. They mine the leaves of their host plant. The mine has the form of a blotch mine on the upperside of the leaf.

References

External links
mothphotographersgroup

Cameraria (moth)

Moths of North America
Lepidoptera of Canada
Lepidoptera of the United States
Moths described in 1889
Leaf miners
Taxa named by Thomas de Grey, 6th Baron Walsingham